Hugo Hermanus Hovenkamp (born 5 October 1950, in Groningen) is a former Dutch football defender, who played for the Dutch club AZ Alkmaar in the late 1970s, early 1980s. He started his professional career for FC Groningen.

Hovenkamp made his international debut for Netherlands in a 2:0 win in February 1977 against England. Hovenkamp was forced to withdraw from the 1978 World Cup squad due to injury, but as the deadline for calling up replacement players had passed, the Netherlands were unable to replace him. He did play in the 1980 European Championships, and played his final international (a 1–0 loss to Spain) in a qualifier for the 1984 European Championship. He obtained 31 caps, scoring 2 goals.

References

External links
  Profile
  FC Groningen profile

1950 births
Living people
Dutch footballers
Dutch expatriate footballers
Netherlands international footballers
1978 FIFA World Cup players
UEFA Euro 1980 players
Eredivisie players
Austrian Football Bundesliga players
AZ Alkmaar players
FC Groningen players
FC Wacker Innsbruck players
Expatriate footballers in Austria
Dutch expatriate sportspeople in Austria
Association football defenders
Footballers from Groningen (city)